NOS Audiovisuais (formerly ZON Lusomundo) is a Portuguese integrated media corporation founded in 1953, which has major interests in movie distribution, cinema theaters and media assets.

It was founded with the purpose of movie distribution, and had a very close relation with the biggest studios (it is currently the Portuguese licensee of United International Pictures, Walt Disney Studios Home Entertainment, Warner Home Video, Miramax Films and DreamWorks SKG). In the 1980s Lusomundo started acquiring newspapers, including Comércio do Porto, Diário de Notícias and Jornal de Notícias. In the early 1990s, it acquired TSF Rádio Notícias and minority stakes of TVI.

In 2000, PT Multimédia made a successful takeover of Lusomundo. Since then, Lusomundo was split into two companies with different owners:

Lusomundo Audiovisuais, which controls the cinema and movie distribution assets
Lusomundo Media (now owned by Global Media Group), which controls other media assets

Until 2007, the Lusomundo brand was used on four premium subscription television movie channels. Nowadays these channels are named TVCine.

In 2007, PT Multimedia separated from PT Comunicações and became ZON Multimédia and this corporation was renamed ZON Lusomundo, in May 2014 it was renamed NOS, officially retiring the 61-year-old Lusomundo name.

References

External links
 

Mass media companies of Portugal
Cinema chains in Portugal